David Dewar Campbell (April 27, 1896 – February 18, 1975) was a Canadian professional hockey defenceman.

Campbell played two games in the National Hockey League for the Montreal Canadiens.  He also played with the amateur team National de Montreal.

He was a Sargeant in the Canadian Army in the First World War.

Campbell coached Victoria Vics and Verdun Maple Leafs of the Quebec Senior Hockey League.  He served as mayor of the village of Lachute.

References

External links
 

1896 births
1975 deaths
Anglophone Quebec people
Canadian ice hockey defencemen
Ice hockey people from Quebec
Montreal Canadiens players
People from Lachute